Edward Godfrey may refer to:

 Edward Settle Godfrey (1843–1932), general in the United States Army
 Edward S. Godfrey (physician) (1878–1960), physician and founder of the first U.S. Epidemiologic Society
 Edward S. Godfrey (judge), emeritus Dean and Professor at the University of Maine School of Law
 Edward Godfrey (colonial governor), first governor of the province of Maine

See also
 Sir Edmund Berry Godfrey (1621–1678), English magistrate